is a former Japanese football player.

Playing career
Shota Tajima played for J3 League club; Fujieda MYFC in 2015 season.

References

External links

1992 births
Living people
Osaka University of Economics alumni
Association football people from Hyōgo Prefecture
Japanese footballers
J3 League players
Fujieda MYFC players
Association football goalkeepers